The 2015 PGA EuroPro Tour, titled as the 2015 HotelPlanner.com PGA EuroPro Tour for sponsorship reasons, was the 14th season of the PGA EuroPro Tour, one of four third-tier tours recognised by the European Tour. 

In July, it was announced that all PGA EuroPro Tour events, beginning with the Wealth Design Invitational, would receive Official World Golf Ranking points at the minimum level of 4 points for a winner of a 54-hole event and 6 points for a winner of a 72-hole event.

The schedule consisted of sixteen events, each having a minimum prize fund of £46,735, which increased depending on how many players made the cut; any unused prize money from the £50,000 maximum was added to the prize fund for the Matchroom Sport Tour Championship. The Clipper Logistics Players Championship, the only 72-hole tournament, had a maximum of £60,000. The Matchroom Sport Tour Championship's prize fund began at £60,000 and topped out at £87,550.

Schedule
The following table lists official events during the 2015 season.

Order of Merit
The Order of Merit was titled as the Race to Desert Springs and was based on prize money won during the season, calculated in Pound sterling. The top five players on the tour (not otherwise exempt) earned status to play on the 2016 Challenge Tour.

Notes

References

PGA EuroPro Tour